Malbolge is a public domain esoteric programming language invented by Ben Olmstead in 1998, named after the eighth circle of hell in Dante's Inferno, the Malebolge. It was specifically designed to be almost impossible to use, via a counter-intuitive 'crazy operation', base-three arithmetic, and self-altering code. It builds on the difficulty of earlier challenging esoteric languages (such as Brainfuck and Befunge), but takes this aspect to the extreme, playing on the entangled histories of computer science and encryption. Despite this design, it is possible to write useful Malbolge programs.

Programming in Malbolge 
Malbolge was very difficult to understand when it arrived. It took two years for the first Malbolge program to appear. The author himself has never written a Malbolge program. The first program was not written by a human being; it was generated by a beam search algorithm designed by Andrew Cooke and implemented in Lisp.

Later, Lou Scheffer posted a cryptanalysis of Malbolge and provided a program to copy its input to its output. He also saved the original interpreter and specification after the original site stopped functioning, and offered a general strategy of writing programs in Malbolge as well as some thoughts on its Turing completeness.

Olmstead believed Malbolge to be a linear bounded automaton. There is a discussion about whether one can implement sensible loops in Malbolge—it took many years before the first non-terminating one was introduced. A correct 99 Bottles of Beer program, which deals with non-trivial loops and conditions, was not announced for seven years; the first correct one was by Hisashi Iizawa in 2005. Hisashi Iizawa et al. also proposed a guide for programming in Malbolge for the purpose of obfuscation for software protection.

In 2020, GitHub user kspalaiologos made a working Lisp interpreter in Malbolge Unshackled.

Example programs

Hello, World! 
This program displays "Hello, World.".

(=<`#9]~6ZY327Uv4-QsqpMn&+Ij"'E%e{Ab~w=_:]Kw%o44Uqp0/Q?xNvL:`H%c#DD2^WV>gY;dts76qKJImZkj

echo program 
This program reads a string from a user and prints that string, similar to Unix echo.(=BA#9"=<;:3y7x54-21q/p-,+*)"!h%B0/.
~P<
<:(8&
66#"!~}|{zyxwvu
gJ%

Design 
Malbolge is machine language for a ternary virtual machine, the Malbolge interpreter.

The standard interpreter and the official specification do not match perfectly. One difference is that the compiler stops execution with data outside the 33–126 range. Although this was initially considered a bug in the compiler, Ben Olmstead stated that it was intended and there was in fact "a bug in the specification".

Registers 
Malbolge has three registers, a, c, and d. When a program starts, the value of all three registers is zero.

a stands for 'accumulator', set to the value written by all write operations on memory and used for standard I/O. c, the code pointer, is special: it points to the current instruction. d is the data pointer. It is automatically incremented after each instruction, but the location it points to is used for the data manipulation commands.

Pointer notation 
d can hold a memory address; [d] is register indirect; the value stored at that address. [c] is similar.

Memory 
The virtual machine has 59,049 (310) memory locations that can each hold a ten-trit ternary number. Each memory location has an address from 0 to 59048 and can hold a value from 0 to 59048. Incrementing past this limit wraps back to zero.

The language uses the same memory space for both data and instructions. This was influenced by how hardware such as x86 architecture worked.

Before a Malbolge program starts, the first part of memory is filled with the program. All whitespace in the program is ignored and, to make programming more difficult, everything else in the program must start out as one of the instructions below.

The rest of memory is filled by using the crazy operation (see below) on the previous two addresses ([m] = crz [m - 2], [m - 1]). Memory filled this way will repeat every twelve addresses (the individual ternary digits will repeat every three or four addresses, so a group of ternary digits is guaranteed to repeat every twelve).

In 2007, Ørjan Johansen created Malbolge Unshackled, a version of Malbolge which does not have the arbitrary memory limit. The hope was to create a Turing-complete language while keeping as much in the spirit of Malbolge as possible. No other rules are changed, and all Malbolge programs that do not reach the memory limit are completely functional.

Instructions 
Malbolge has eight instructions. Malbolge figures out which instruction to execute by taking the value [c], adding the value of c to it, and taking the remainder when this is divided by 94. The final result tells the interpreter what to do:

After each instruction is executed, the guilty instruction gets encrypted (see below) so that it will not do the same thing next time, unless a jump just happened. Right after a jump, Malbolge will encrypt the innocent instruction just prior to the one it jumped to instead. Then, the values of both c and d are increased by one and the next instruction is executed.

Crazy operation  
For each ternary digit of both inputs, use the following table to get a ternary digit of the result. For example, crz 0001112220, 0120120120 gives 1001022211.

Encipherment
After an instruction is executed, the value at [c] (without anything added to it) will be replaced with itself mod 94. Then, the result is enciphered with one of the following two equivalent methods.

 Method 1 Find the result below. Store the ASCII code of the character below it at [c].
 0000000000111111111122222222223333333333444444444455555555556666666666777777777788888888889999
 0123456789012345678901234567890123456789012345678901234567890123456789012345678901234567890123
 ----------------------------------------------------------------------------------------------
 9m<.TVac`uY*MK'X~xDl}REokN:#?G"i@5z]&gqtyfr$(we4{WP)H-Zn,[%\3dL+Q;>U!pJS72FhOA1CB6v^=I_0/8|jsb

 Method 2 Find the result below. Store the encrypted version at [c].

Lou Scheffer's cryptanalysis of Malbolge mentions six different cycles in the permutation. They are listed here:

 33 ⇒ 53 ⇒ 45 ⇒ 119 ⇒ 78 ⇒ 49 ⇒ 87 ⇒ 48 ⇒ 123 ⇒ 71 ⇒ 83 ⇒ 94 ⇒ 57 ⇒ 91 ⇒ 106 ⇒ 77 ⇒ 65 ⇒ 59 ⇒ 92 ⇒ 115 ⇒ 82 ⇒ 118 ⇒ 107 ⇒ 75 ⇒ 104 ⇒ 89 ⇒ 56 ⇒ 44 ⇒ 40 ⇒ 121 ⇒ 35 ⇒ 93 ⇒ 98 ⇒ 84 ⇒ 61 ⇒ 100 ⇒ 97 ⇒ 46 ⇒ 101 ⇒ 99 ⇒ 86 ⇒ 95 ⇒ 109 ⇒ 88 ⇒ 47 ⇒ 52 ⇒ 72 ⇒ 55 ⇒ 110 ⇒ 126 ⇒ 64 ⇒ 81 ⇒ 54 ⇒ 90 ⇒ 124 ⇒ 34 ⇒ 122 ⇒ 63 ⇒ 43 ⇒ 36 ⇒ 38 ⇒ 113 ⇒ 108 ⇒ 39 ⇒ 116 ⇒ 69 ⇒ 112 ⇒ 68 ⇒ 33 ...
 37 ⇒ 103 ⇒ 117 ⇒ 111 ⇒ 120 ⇒ 58 ⇒ 37 ...
 41 ⇒ 102 ⇒ 96 ⇒ 60 ⇒ 51 ⇒ 41 ...
 42 ⇒ 114 ⇒ 125 ⇒ 105 ⇒ 42 ...
 50 ⇒ 80 ⇒ 66 ⇒ 62 ⇒ 76 ⇒ 79 ⇒ 67 ⇒ 85 ⇒ 73 ⇒ 50 ...
 70 ⇒ 74 ⇒ 70 ...

These cycles can be used to create loops that do different things each time and that eventually become repetitive. Lou Scheffer used this idea to create a Malbolge program (included in his cryptanalysis linked below) that repeats anything the user inputs.

Variants 
Malbolge is not Turing-complete, due to its memory limits. However, it otherwise has sequential execution, repetition, and conditional-execution. Several attempts have been made to create Turing-complete versions of Malbolge:

 Malbolge20 is a version of Malbolge with an expanded word-size of 20 trits, allowing one to write a program with a size of up to ~3.4 gigabytes.

 Malbolge-T is a theoretical version of Malbolge that resets the input/output stream upon reaching the end, allowing for unbounded programs. Malbolge-T would be backward compatible with Malbolge.
 Malbolge Unshackled is a hopefully Turing-complete variation, allowing for programs of any length. However, due to command variations to allow for values above 257, valid Malbolge programs will not necessarily run correctly in Malbolge Unshackled.

Popular culture 
In the television series Elementary, during the episode "The Leviathan" (season 1, episode 10), a clue written on a coffee order is described as having been written in Malbolge. It appears to be a small modification of the more verbose "Hello World" example shown above.

In the Leverage: Redemption episode "The Golf Job" (season 1, episode 12), an SMS auto-reply reads "Breanna is unavailable Thursday through Sunday or until she masters Malbolge code."

In the Billions episode "The Limitless Shit" (season 5, episode 7), a programmer analyst at Axe Capital explains that he "... used to dick around with Malbolge, but just for fun."

See also 

 INTERCAL
 Obfuscated code

References

External links 
 Malbolge interpreter (C source code)
 Malbolge interpreter, debugger, assembler and example Malbolge Assembly code (Java source code)
 Treatise on writing Malbolge programs; takes Scheffer's analysis a bit further
 A project devoted to present programs written in Malbolge

Esoteric programming languages
Non-English-based programming languages
Programming languages created in 1998